Bergara is a town in Spain.

Bergara may also refer to:
Markel Bergara, Spanish footballer
Ane Bergara, Spanish footballer
Mario Bergara, Uruguayan economist
Mario Ludovico Bergara, Uruguayan footballer
Gaizka Bergara, Spanish footballer
Danny Bergara, Uruguayan footballer
Iñaki Bergara, Spanish footballer
Federico Bergara, Uruguayan footballer
Ignacio Bergara, Spanish footballer

See also
Vergara (disambiguation)